The 1932 Anhalt state election was held on 24 April 1932 to elect the 36 members of the Landtag of the Free State of Anhalt.

Results

References 

Anhalt
Elections in Saxony-Anhalt